Olof Hanson may refer to:

 Olof Hanson (architect) (1862–1933), Swedish-American architect
 Olof Hanson (politician) (1882–1952), Canadian politician